Chin Parch (also Romanized as Chīn Pārch; also known as Chīnī Pārch) is a village in Tuskacheshmeh Rural District, in the Central District of Galugah County, Mazandaran Province, Iran. At the 2006 census, its population was 27, in 5 families.

References 

Populated places in Galugah County